Necrodes is a genus of carrion beetles in the family Silphidae. There are at least four described species in Necrodes.

Species
These four species belong to the genus Necrodes:
 Necrodes littoralis (Linnaeus, 1758)
 Necrodes nigricornis Harold, 1875
 Necrodes primaevus Beutenmüller & Cockerell, 1908
 Necrodes surinamensis (Fabricius, 1775) (red-lined carrion beetle)

References

Further reading

External links

 

Silphidae
Staphyliniformia genera
Taxa named by William Elford Leach
Articles created by Qbugbot